These are the list of personnel changes in the NBA from the 1962–63 NBA season.

Events

July 13, 1962
 The Cincinnati Royals traded Larry Staverman to the Chicago Zephyrs for Dave Piontek. Staverman played in the ABL in between.

August 29, 1962
 The New York Knicks traded Darrall Imhoff and cash to the Detroit Pistons for Gene Shue.

September 5, 1962
 The Syracuse Nationals sold Dick Barnett to the Los Angeles Lakers.

September 10, 1962
 The Chicago Zephyrs traded Gene Conley to the New York Knicks for Phil Jordon and Cliff Luyk.

September 11, 1962
 The Chicago Zephyrs signed Johnny Cox as a free agent.

September 14, 1962
 The Los Angeles Lakers traded Tom Hawkins to the Cincinnati Royals for a 1963 2nd round draft pick (Jim King was later selected).

September 19, 1962
 The Detroit Pistons sold George Lee to the San Francisco Warriors.

October 7, 1962
 The St. Louis Hawks traded Charlie Hardnett to the Chicago Zephyrs for Phil Jordon.

October 12, 1962
 The Cincinnati Royals sold Bevo Nordmann to the St. Louis Hawks.

October 18, 1962
 The Boston Celtics sold Gary Phillips to the San Francisco Warriors.

November 19, 1962
 The St. Louis Hawks traded Nick Mantis to the Chicago Zephyrs for a future 2nd round draft pick.

December 5, 1962
 The San Francisco Warriors traded Tom Gola to the New York Knicks for Willie Naulls and Kenny Sears.

December 28, 1962
 The Chicago Zephyrs fired Jack McMahon as head coach.
 The Chicago Zephyrs hired Slick Leonard as head coach.

January ?, 1963
 The Chicago Zephyrs signed Maury King as a free agent.

January 1, 1963
 The New York Knicks signed Bevo Nordmann as a free agent.

January 22, 1963
 The Boston Celtics sold Jack Foley to the New York Knicks.

January 30, 1963
 The Chicago Zephyrs traded Woody Sauldsberry to the St. Louis Hawks for Barney Cable.

February 1, 1963
 The San Francisco Warriors signed Fred LaCour as a free agent.

April 13, 1963
 Dick McGuire resigns as head coach for Detroit Pistons.

May 21, 1963
 Charles Wolf resigns as head coach for Cincinnati Royals.
 The Detroit Pistons hire Charles Wolf as head coach.

June 18, 1963
 The Cincinnati Royals hire Jack McMahon as head coach.

References
 NBA Transactions at NBA.com
 1962-63 NBA Transactions| Basketball-Reference.com
 

Transactions
NBA transactions